Pycnobathra acromelas is a moth of the family Gelechiidae. It is found in Australia, where it has been recorded from New South Wales.

The wingspan is about 14 mm. The forewings are whitish with a slight brownish suffusion. The discal dots and a few scattered scales are blackish and the first discal is found at one-third, the second at two-thirds and the plical well beyond the first discal. There is a small irregular apical blackish spot, with some marginal blackish dots on the costa towards the apex and on the termen. The hindwings are grey.

References

Moths described in 1919
Anomologini